Umatilla may refer to:

Umatilla people and culture 
Umatilla people, a Native American tribe from Oregon
Umatilla Indian Reservation, an Indian reservation in Oregon
Umatilla language, a Native American language from the Plateau Penutian group
Confederated Tribes of the Umatilla Indian Reservation, a Native American tribal entity in the U.S. state of Oregon

Places
Umatilla County, Oregon, a county in Oregon
Umatilla, Oregon, a city located in Umatilla County, Oregon
Umatilla, Florida, a city in Lake County, in the U.S. state Florida

Umatilla River, a river in Oregon

Umatilla Chemical Depot, a U.S. Army facility near the city of Umatilla, Oregon